Apache ActiveMQ is an open source message broker written in Java together with a full Java Message Service (JMS) client. It provides "Enterprise Features" which in this case means fostering the communication from more than one client or server. Supported clients include Java via JMS 1.1 as well as several other "cross language" clients. The communication is managed with features such as computer clustering and ability to use any database as a JMS persistence provider besides virtual memory, cache, and journal persistency.

There's another broker under the ActiveMQ umbrella code-named Artemis. It is based on the HornetQ code-base which was donated from the JBoss community to the Apache ActiveMQ community in 2015. Artemis is the "next generation" broker from ActiveMQ and will ultimately become the next major version of ActiveMQ.

History
The ActiveMQ project was originally created by its founders from LogicBlaze in 2004, as an open source message broker, hosted by CodeHaus. The code and ActiveMQ trademark were donated to the Apache Software Foundation in 2007, where the founders continued to develop the codebase with the extended Apache community.

Technical features
ActiveMQ employs several modes for high availability, including both file-system and database row-level locking mechanisms, sharing of the persistence store via a shared filesystem, or true replication using Apache ZooKeeper.  A horizontal scaling mechanism called a Network of Brokers, is also supported out of the box.  ActiveMQ supports a relatively large number of transport protocols, including OpenWire, STOMP, MQTT, AMQP, REST, and WebSockets.

Usage
ActiveMQ is used in enterprise service bus implementations such as Apache ServiceMix and Mule. Other projects using ActiveMQ include Apache Camel and Apache CXF in SOA infrastructure projects.

Benchmark
Coinciding with the release of Apache ActiveMQ 5.3, the world's first results for the SPECjms2007 industry standard benchmark were announced. Four results were submitted to the SPEC and accepted for publication. The results cover different topologies to analyze the scalability of Apache ActiveMQ in two dimensions.

Commercial support
used in enterprise software.Apache offers limited ActiveMQ support on a volunteer basis.  Commercial companies specializing in ActiveMQ are recommended for users needing more extensive support.

See also

Amazon SQS
Amazon Simple Notification Service
Enterprise Integration Patterns
Enterprise messaging system
Event-driven SOA
Message-oriented middleware
Service-oriented architecture

References

Bibliography

External links

Official GitHub repository

ActiveMQ
Enterprise application integration
Java enterprise platform
Message-oriented middleware
Service-oriented architecture-related products